Goniurosaurus chengzheng, also known as the Chengzheng cave gecko, is a gecko endemic to China.

References

Goniurosaurus
Reptiles of China
Reptiles described in 2021